Toivo Jullinen (born 28 May 1963 Paide) is an Estonian politician. He was a member of VII Riigikogu.

References

Living people
1963 births
Members of the Riigikogu, 1992–1995
People from Paide
Members of the Riigikogu, 1995–1999